Wanshousi station is a station on Line 16 of the Beijing Subway.

History 
Construction of this station started in March 2014. A pedestrian bridge going over the 3rd Ring Road was demolished to construct the station. The station opened in 2020.

Station Layout 
The station has an underground island platform. This station has 3 exits, lettered A, C, and D. Exit D is accessible via an elevator.

See also 
Wanshou Temple

References 

Beijing Subway stations in Haidian District